This Time may refer to:

Film and television
 This Time (film), a 2016 film
 This Time with Alan Partridge, a British comedy television series

Music

Albums
 This Time (Al Jarreau album), or the title song, 1980
 This Time (Beanie Sigel album), or the title song, 2012
 This Time (Chantay Savage album), or the title song, 1999
 This Time (Dwight Yoakam album), or the title song, 1993
 This Time (Los Lobos album), or the title song, 1999
 This Time (Melanie C album), or the title song (see below), 2007
 This Time (Natalia album), or the title song, 2003
 This Time (Robert Cray album), or the title song, 2009
 This Time (Taral Hicks album), or the title song, 1997
 This Time (Thomas Anders album), or the title song, 2004
 This Time (Waylon Jennings album), or the title song (see below), 1974
 This Time – The First Four Years, by Culture Club, 1987
 This Time..., by Anthony Braxton, 1970
 This Time, by Lee Soo Young, 2003
 This Time, by Rock Goddess, 2019
 This Time..., by Stevie B, 2006

Songs
 "This Time" (Axwell & Ingrosso song), 2015
 "This Time" (Bryan Adams song), 1983
 "This Time" (Dina Carroll song), 1993
 "This Time" (Dragon song), 1976
 "This Time" (Glee song), by Lea Michele from the TV series Glee, 2015
 "This Time" (INXS song), 1985
 "This Time" (Kiara song), 1988
 "This Time" (Melanie C song), 2007
 "This Time" (Melanie Fiona song), 2012
 "This Time" (Monika Linkytė and Vaidas Baumila song), representing Lithuania at Eurovision 2015
 "This Time" (Patricia Conroy song), 1990
 "This Time" (Pia Toscano song), 2011
 "This Time" (Sawyer Brown song), 1994
 "This Time" (Starsailor song), 2006
 "This Time" (Thomas Wayne song), 1958; covered by Troy Shondell, 1961
 "This Time" (Waylon Jennings song), 1974
 "This Time" (William Mangion song), representing Malta at Eurovision 1993
 "This Time"/"I Wish You Well", by Cara Dillon, 2006
 "This Time", by 3 Doors Down from Away from the Sun
 "This Time", by Amanda Perez
 "This Time", by Benny Mardones, written by Benny Mardones and Robert Tepper, from Too Much to Lose
 "This Time", by Benny Mardones, written by Benny Mardones and James K. Ervin, from Let's Hear It for Love
 "This Time", by Carrie Underwood from Play On
 "This Time", by Celine Dion from Taking Chances
 "This Time", by Cherie and Marie Currie from Messin' with the Boys
 "This Time", by Chicago from Chicago XI
 "This Time", by DJ Antoine
 "This Time", by Depswa from Two Angels and a Dream
 "This Time", by the Feeling from Join With Us
 "This Time", by the Gear Daddies from Let's Go Scare Al
 "This Time", by Guano Apes from Bel Air
 "This Time", by Il Volo from Il Volo
 "This Time", by Irving Berlin
 "This Time", by Janet Jackson from Janet
 "This Time", by JDiggz featuring Neverending White Lights
 "This Time", by John Legend from Evolver
 "This Time", by John Mellencamp from Nothin' Matters and What If It Did
 "This Time", by JoJo from The High Road
 "This Time", by Kayzo, 2017
 "This Time", by Klymaxx from One Day
 "This Time", by Kutless from Kutless
 "This Time", by Life of Agony from River Runs Red
 "This Time", by P.O.D. from Testify
 "This Time", by Rae Morris from Unguarded
 "This Time," by Shana
 "This Time", by Shirley Bassey from The Performance
 "This Time", by the Smashing Pumpkins from Machina: The Machines of God
 "This Time", by Suede from Sci-Fi Lullabies
 "This Time", by Tracy Chapman from Crossroads
 "This Time", by Vanessa Carlton from Heroes & Thieves
 "This Time", by the Verve from Urban Hymns
 "This Time", by Wet Wet Wet from The Memphis Sessions
 "This Time", by Wonder Girls, a B-side from the single "So Hot"
 "This Time (We'll Get it Right)", by the England national football team, a 1982 UK hit single by footballers